Pierre Tritz,  ([pjɛʁ tʁits]), born on 19 September 1914 in Heckling-les-Bouzonville, Moselle, France, and died on 10 September 2016 in Manila in the Philippines, was a French Jesuit Priest. It was in 1926, while visiting a missionary exhibition with his parents that young Pierre discovered in faith a vocation as a priest and as an adventurous missionary.

In 1927, he left his native Lorraine and in 1933 joined the Novitiate of the Jesuits in  Florennes in Belgium. In 1936, he moved to China and met a renowned scientist, Father Pierre Teilhard de Chardin whom he would frequent for ten years. Father Tritz teaches at  Tientsin and studies philosophy and then theology in the  Zikawei district of Shanghai before being ordained a priest there in 1944. It is in 1948 that he was forced to return to France after the communist revolution and the victory of  Mao.

From 1950, he settled permanently in Manila in the Philippines, initially to teach there. He obtained the Filipino nationality in 1974 and created ERDA Foundation "Education Research and Development Assistance". He managed to get 75,000 children out of poverty, prostitution, tetanus and hunger by helping their parents living in the slums of Manila to send their children to school and give them hope.<ref> Jean-Claude Darrigaud,  Les Anti-trottoirs de Manille: Pierre Tritz, father of street children ' ', Paris: Fayard, 1992. </ref> To date, ERDA has already helped more than 800,000 children.

Father Tritz joined Raoul Follereau and his teams in 1976 and created FAHAN Foundation for the Assistance to Hansenite in coordination with the Philippines Leprosy Mission of the Philippine Ministry of Health. In 2000, there were 3,379 cases of leprosy in the Philippines. He decides to create a leper colony that is not only a treatment center for contagious cases but also a place of life for mutilated and excluded people.

Father Tritz, nicknamed “Father Teresa of Manila”, has received numerous awards including the Raoul Follereau Prize from the Académie Française in 1983 and the Legion of Honor in 1996.

He was fluent in French, Francic, German, English, Chinese, Spanish and Latin.

 Cory Aquino, former President of the Republic of the Philippines, said: In India, there is Mother Teresa, in Cairo there is Sister Emmanuelle, in the Philippines we have Father Tritz

References 

20th-century French Jesuits
Recipients of the Order of Merit of the Federal Republic of Germany
1914 births
2016 deaths
People from Moselle (department)
20th-century Filipino Roman Catholic priests